Venzella Newsome Jones (1893-1973) was a black actress, orator, playwright, drama teacher, and theatre director.

Education and career 

Jones was born in Ohio. She attended King's School of Oratory in Pittburgh, becoming its first black graduate. Later she taught drama at Rust College, Mississippi and at Morgan State College in Baltimore.

She organised the Imperial Art Players in Pittburgh in 1924 and later formed the eponymous Venzella Jones Repertory Group.

She was the Director of the Federal Theatre Project’s Negro Youth Theatre.

References

Further reading 

1893 births
1973 deaths
African-American dramatists and playwrights
American women dramatists and playwrights
20th-century American dramatists and playwrights
African-American actresses
American stage actresses
20th-century African-American women
20th-century African-American people